The Platino Award for Best Art Direction (Spanish: Premio Platino a la mejor dirección de arte) is one of the Platino Awards, Ibero-America's film awards, presented by the Entidad de Gestión de Derechos de los Productores Audiovisuales (EGEDA) and the Federación Iberoamericana de Productores Cinematográficos y Audiovisuales (FIPCA). The category was first awarded at the second edition of the awards in 2015.

In the list below. the winner of the award for each year is shown first, followed by the other nominees.

Awards and nominations

2010s

2020s

See also
 Goya Award for Best Art Direction

References

External links
Official site

Platino Awards